Ritz Crackers is a brand of snack cracker introduced by Nabisco in 1934. Each cracker has seven perforations and a finely scalloped edge. Today, the Ritz cracker brand is owned by Mondelēz International.

A single serving of the original cracker (about 5 crackers or 15 grams) provides  of food energy, 1 gram of protein, and 4 grams of fat; the whole wheat variety provides  and 2.5 grams of fat.

History
In the early 1900s, the Jackson Cracker company of Jackson, Michigan, developed a small, round cracker called the Jaxon. The company was bought out by Nabisco in 1919. Nabisco introduced the Ritz Cracker in 1934. Looking to compete with the similar Hi Ho cracker made by their competitor Sunshine Biscuits, they tasked an employee, Sydney Stern, to create a name and a marketing plan. Stern chose the name 'Ritz', which appealed to individuals enduring the privations of the Great Depression by offering them "a bite of the good life". He also designed the blue circle/yellow lettering logo design, inspired by the round label inside his hat. In 2011, Ritz was identified in a YouGov poll as the "best perceived snack brand" among American consumers.

A cartoon drawing of a box of Ritz Crackers can be seen in Mickey’s Surprise Party (1939), an animated theatrical advertisement/cartoon short produced by Walt Disney Productions for Nabisco.

United States

Ritz Crackers varieties include Original, Roasted Vegetable, Honey Wheat, Garlic Butter, Reduced Fat, Hint of Salt, Whole Wheat, Everything and Ritz Fresh Stacks.

They are also available as sandwiches with peanut butter and cheddar cheese.

International 

Ritz Crackers are available in the United Kingdom and Ireland in three varieties: Original and Cheese flavour are sold in 200 g boxes, and Ritz Cheese Sandwich (a cheese spread sandwiched between two Ritz Crackers) is available in 125 g roll packs and 33 g snack packs. They are also available as mini-crackers in 25g multi-packs.

Ritz Crackers are available as dippers for Dairylea Dunkers and Philadelphia Snack. Ritz Crackers are also available as part of a confectionery product made by Cadbury in which the crackers form a sandwich filled with Cadbury Dairy Milk chocolate.

See also

 List of crackers

References

External links

Products introduced in 1934
Nabisco brands
Brand name crackers
Mondelez International brands